The canton of Montaigu-Vendée (before 2021: Montaigu) is an administrative division of the Vendée department, western France. Its borders were modified at the French canton reorganisation which came into effect in March 2015. Its seat is in Montaigu-Vendée.

It consists of the following communes:
 
Bazoges-en-Paillers
La Boissière-de-Montaigu
Les Brouzils
Chauché
Chavagnes-en-Paillers
La Copechagnière
Mesnard-la-Barotière
Montaigu-Vendée
La Rabatelière
Saint-André-Goule-d'Oie
Saint-Fulgent
Treize-Septiers
Vendrennes

References

Cantons of Vendée